Ioan Evans may refer to:
 Ioan Evans (politician)
 Ioan Evans (footballer)
 Ioan Evans (rugby union)

See also
 Ian Evans (disambiguation)